Potamon is  a genus of freshwater or semiterrestrial crabs. Potamon may also refer to:

 Potamon of Heraclea (died c. 341), a bishop of Heraclea in Egypt who was martyred
 Potamon of Mytilene (c. 65 BC–AD 25), a rhetorician in the Greek city of Mytilene
 Potamon (mythology), in Greek mythology an Egyptian prince, one of the sons of King Aegyptus
 Potamidae, a family of freshwater crabs